Don is a 2022 Indian Tamil-language coming-of-age comedy drama film written and directed by Cibi Chakaravarthi, in his directorial debut. Produced by Lyca Productions and Sivakarthikeyan Productions, it stars Sivakarthikeyan, S. J. Suryah, Samuthirakani, Priyanka Arul Mohan, Soori and Sivaangi Krishnakumar. The film revolves around a reluctant engineering student repeatedly clashing with his college's discipline mentor, while still trying to discover his passion in life and prove his eligibility to his father.

The film was officially announced in 2021 with production taking place between February–December 2021. It was shot extensively across Tamil Nadu including Coimbatore, Chennai, Pollachi and Udumalaipettai, while a song was filmed in Agra. The film features music composed by Anirudh Ravichander, with cinematography and editing by K. M. Bhaskaran and Nagooran respectively.

Don theatrically released on 13 May 2022 and received positive reviews from critics and audiences, who praised the performances, soundtrack, cinematography, direction, story, screenplay, dialogues, humour, emotional weight, climax and social message. The film grossed over 100 crores at the worldwide box office and became a critical and commercial success.

Plot 
Chakaravarthi, a famous film director, is desperately trying to reach his college. As he drives, he narrates the story based on his college days:

Chakaravarthi's father, Ganesan, is a strict father who cares a lot about Chakaravarthi's studies and wants him to be a civil engineer. But Chakaravarthi hates studying and lies to his father about his test marks. Meanwhile, Chakaravarthi falls in love with Angaiyarkanni alias Angu, during his school days. Initially, she avoids him, but soon reciprocates his feelings, but they end up going their separate ways after Ganesan and Angu's father have a confrontation about their relationship, since Chakaravarthi claims Angu is just his friend, to avoid his father bashing him up.

Chakaravarthi joins BEC (Best Engineering College) in Coimbatore, where his expectations of enjoying college life is ruined by the college's disciplinarian professor, Bhoominathan, who the students fear and hate. Chakaravarthi constructs a plan to send Bhoominathan away to be a visiting professor in St. Paul's University in Russia so that the students can be in a happy environment. Meanwhile, Chakaravarthi meets Angu again, who also joins BEC. He tries to woo her, but in vain where Angu befriends Lilly, a first year student. Lilly explains to Chakravarthi, that after the incident in their school days, Angu's father stopped talking to her.

Chakaravarthi successfully patches them up after he creates a short film and ends it on an emotional note that Angu's father and Angu get reunited. Angu is impressed and reciprocates his feelings. Amidst all of this, Bhoominathan unexpectedly returns from Russia, and discovers that Chakaravarthi was the one who sent him to Russia. In revenge, he clicks a photo of Chakaravarthi and Angu at the Taj Mahal and uses it to complain to Killivallavan, the chairman of BEC. Chakaravarthi, in return, presents a picture of Bhoominathan with Miss Swetha at the Taj Mahal. This gains the wrath of Killivallavan, who is disappointed about Bhoominathan.

Meanwhile, Ganesan finds out the truth about Chakaravarthi in the college and his test marks, including the school. Feeling cheated and enraged, he slaps Chakaravarthi. Chakaravarthi decides to venture into filmmaking by attending a short film competition and secretly films portions in the college, with the help of cameraman Perusu. When nearing the climax, Bhoominathan finds out about his secret filming. With a muddle up of guns, drama and confusion, Bhoominathan suffers an accident that severely injures his neck, but eventually survives.

Ganesan finds out about Chakaravarthi's secret filmmaking and destroys his short film because of which Chakaravarthi and Ganesan have an intense confrontation. Frustrated with his father, he leaves the house. Bhoominathan gradually recovers, whilst Chakaravarthi prepares another short film for the competition. Bhoominathan and Chakaravarthi develop a good rapport and Bhoominathan tells Chakaravarthi that if he clears all of his arrears, he can get his Engineering Degree, thus burying the hatchet and ending their conflict.

Chakaravarthi's short film gets shortlisted to the top and ends up being turned into a feature film, that enters the 100 Crore Club. It is revealed that the film is about Chakaravarthi's own emotional bonding with Ganesan and his realisation Ganesan really did care for him before he died. Chakaravarthi later marries Angu. The reason for Chakaravarthi's desperation to get to the college was to get his engineering degree from the hands of Bhoominathan. He delivers an emotional speech to the students and audience, upon accepting and taking his degree, and also sees a vision of Ganesan applauding. Chakaravarthi is revealed to have been added to the Proud Alumni list at BEC, something which he asked from Bhoominathan, in his earlier days at the college.

Cast

Production

Development 
In August 2017, Sivakarthikeyan was reported to collaborate with his friend Vignesh Shivan, post Suriya's Thaanaa Serndha Koottam, with the film's producer K. E. Gnanavel Raja of Studio Green also obtained its rights for the forthcoming project. However, the film failed to materialise and in March 2018, and Sivakarthikeyan instead agreed to do another film for Raja, which became the M. Rajesh-directorial Mr. Local. In March 2019, Lyca Productions announced another project featuring Sivakarthikeyan and Vignesh Shivan with Anirudh Ravichander set to score music. Vignesh also finalised the script for the film in June 2019, as the project was scheduled to begin production the following month. In a turn of events, Lyca Productions backed out of producing the venture and Vignesh Shivan too prioritised to revive his shelved project Kaathuvaakula Rendu Kaadhal which began production in late-2020.

In September 2020, Sivakarthikeyan announced another new project for Lyca Productions with a debutant director hired to helm the project. The project was officially announced on 27 January 2021, which was titled as Don in Tamil and was later titled as College Don for the Telugu version and the actor himself co-produced the film under his Sivakarthikeyan Productions banner. It was directed by Cibi Chakaravarthi, an associate director of Atlee, with Anirudh Ravichander being the music composer. Sivakarthikeyan was reported to appear as a school student for few portions in the film, and also reduced weight for his role.

In an interview with Ananda Vikatan, Chakravarthi described Don as an extended version of a short film titled Bittu, starring Kaali Venkat and Bala Saravanan. He said Bittu was initially scheduled to be premiered as a television pilot, but due to difficulties, he instead released it as a short film on the internet. When he was working as an assistant director to Atlee in Mersal (2017), the film's star Vijay watched the short and appreciated his work, motivating him to work on an extended version of the pilot film to be his directorial debut.

Casting 
According to Udhayanidhi Stalin, he was the initial choice for the lead role before Sivakarthikeyan was finalised. On 3 February 2021, the makers announced the principal cast of the film which included Priyanka Arul Mohan, S. J. Suryah, and Samuthirakani. Priyanka reunited with Sivakarthikeyan in the film, which marked their second collaboration after Doctor. Soori who also collaborated with the actor in several films based on rural settings (Varuthapadaatha Vaalibar Sangam, Rajinimurugan, Seemaraja and Namma Veettu Pillai), joined for the first time in an urban-setting film. The next week, Munishkanth, Bala Saravanan, Kaali Venkat, RJ Vijay and Sivaangi Krishnakumar (in her acting debut) were also announced as part of the cast. Both Saravanan and Venkat were part of Bittu. Sharing about his role in the film, Vijay said that "I used to stare and look at them performing, forgetting that I myself is an actor in that scene. Don is a big learning experience. I am seeing everything in close quarters and it is a lifetime opportunity."

Filming 

Principal photography began on 11 February 2021 at Coimbatore. A launch event for the film took place in Chennai followed by a traditional pooja ceremony, which saw the presence of the film's cast and crew in entirety. Major portions of the film is scheduled to take place at KPR Institute of Engineering and Technology, located in the suburbs of Coimbatore, with the film is scheduled to be wrapped in a single stretch of 40 days, with more than 20–25 days were allotted for two schedules each. This schedule started on 15 February and ended on 15 March, which was filmed within 28 days. The team then moved to Chennai, to begin the second filming schedule on 22 March which was completed within a span of 25 days. A song titled "Jalabulajangu" was filmed at the outskirts of Chennai, during this schedule. Choreography performed by Shobi, the actor danced to the track in one leg, similar to the moves that Vijay did in "Valayappatti Thavile" from Azhagiya Tamil Magan (2007), also choreographed by Shobi.

The team intended to start the next schedule of filming, but was halted on late-April 2021 due to the rise in COVID-19 cases in Tamil Nadu. The second schedule began on 15 July 2021 with scenes were mostly in Chennai and its surrounding areas. Additional campus scenes were filmed in Hindustan Institute of Technology and Science in Chennai. With the schedule being wrapped in 24 days, the team headed to Pollachi and Udumalaipettai, to progress the shoot further on 10 August. During filming, the first day shoot was halted after large number of locals gathered at the shooting spot, and the crew did not receive permission from the authorities, since the location is close to the forest boundary. The team were fined 19,400 for shooting without permission and overcrowding. In September 2021, the team had completed this schedule and headed to Agra for a song shoot at the Taj Mahal. In October 2021, S. J. Suryah completed all the portions for the film. By then, Sivakarthikeyan had completed shooting for the film, except for one song. After the completion of that track, filming wrapped on 10 December 2021.

Post-production 
Post-production for the film began during 23 September 2021, with the dubbing process. Sivakarthikeyan and Sivaangi Krishnakumar began dubbing for their portions.  On 9 November 2021, Sivakarthikeyan tweeted that he had completed the dubbing works of the film in Chennai, despite the bad weather prevailing. In late-December 2021, Chakravarthi had announced that S. J. Suryah had completed dubbing his portions for the film.

Music 

The film's soundtrack album is composed by Anirudh Ravichander, in his seventh collaboration with Sivakarthikeyan. The lyrics for the songs were written by Vignesh Shivan and Rokesh. Besides acting, Sivakarthikeyan had written lyrics for one of the tracks, which was a duet song. In an interview to Radio Mirchi, Anirudh revealed that the film will feature five songs and will be a youthful album to be appreciated by the masses.

On 16 December 2021, the first single track from the film titled "Jalabulajangu" was released by Sony Music, which features vocals written by Rokesh and sung by the composer himself. It is a college dance number, infused with campus band tune with heavy beats. The opening lyrics of the track also featured lines such as "Ammuku Dummuku Amaal Dumaal" and "Inna Thalaa" which were popular among the masses (Amukku Dumukku Ajith was credited for the lines in the track). In the year-end review for Cinema Express, Avinash Ramachandran's article about Jukebox 2021, mentioned the track regarding the use of trending and popular words in film songs.

The second single "Bae" was released on 3 February 2022. Written by Vignesh Shivan, the track was sung by Adithya RK. The third single "Private Party" was released on 30 April 2022. K. M. Bhaskaran, the cinematographer spoke about the filming of the song: "It was planned aesthetically from the beginning. Private Party was one of the firsts for Sivakarthikeyan when it came to costumes and the sets. We went with neon lightings and different layers of colours like green, blue and red. The art direction team was on the same page as well".

Release

Theatrical 
Don was initially reported to be releasing in the Valentine's Day weekend 14 February 2022, and later 17 February 2022, to coincide with Sivakarthikeyan's birthday. However, in late-January 2022, the film was confirmed to be releasing on 25 March 2022. The release was postponed in order to avoid clashing with RRR being scheduled to release on the same date, and a new release date of 13 May 2022 was announced later.
The film was finally released theatrically on 13 May 2022 along with a Telugu dubbed version titled College Don.

Distribution 
The distribution rights of the film in Tamil Nadu were acquired by Udhayanidhi Stalin under the banner of Red Giant Movies.

Marketing 
The film's trailer launch and pre release event was held in Jeppiar College at Chennai with most of the cast and crew attending the pre release event of the film. The trailer of the film was also released on that day.

Home media 
The satellite rights of the film were sold to Kalaignar TV. The digital rights were acquired by Netflix and was started streaming from 10 June 2022.

Reception

Box office 
On the first day of its release, the film grossed over 16 crore at the domestic box office. According to reports from Pinkvilla, the film collected over 8.5 crore in Tamil Nadu, 75 lakhs in Karnataka, 50 lakhs in Andhra Pradesh and Telangana states, and 20 lakhs in rest of India.

According to reports from Times of India, the film after two days of its theatrical run, has grossed around 15 crore. On the third day of its release, the film crossed the box office collection of 30 crore mark. On the fourth and the fifth day of its release, the film grossed 47.50 and 44.50 crores worldwide respectively. The Telugu version, College Don grossed 3.10 crore on the fifth day of its release. By the second week of its theatrical release, the film had grossed 100 crore.

Critical response 
The film received mostly positive reviews from critics and audience.

Praveen Sudevan of The Hindu gave a negative review: "After a stoic detour from Doctor, Sivakarthikeyan is back laughing and crying, singing and dancing, but he still cannot salvage Don's humdrum affair". Janani K. of India Today gave 3 out of 5 stars stating that "Don is a mindless entertainer with a moving message. With brilliant comedy sequences and pulsating songs, Don is strictly a theatre watch". Soundarya Athimuthu of The Quint gave 3.5 out of 5 stars and wrote that " 'Don' Is Full of Cliches, but Still Worth a Watch". Ashameera Aiyappan of Firstpost rated the film 2.5 out of 5, stating, "It aims to speak of the well-oiled processing machine that our education system is. No matter what the input is, the output needs to be the same. It also aspires to speak of the steadfast faith Indian parents have in this system. But for a film with such lofty ideals, Don's writing rarely engages with nuance. It only deals with extremes".

M Suganth of The Times of India gave 3 out of 5 stars and wrote that "Cibi Chakaravarthi's conviction and Anirudh's vibrant score carry the film over the finishing line and ensure that despite the somewhat formulaic treatment of this material (it is clearly influenced by the films of the early 2000s), the film remains largely entertaining". Haricharan Pudipeddi of Hindustan Times stated, "As you walk out of the movie, you're left on an emotional high and that makes you overlook the largely predictable first half of the movie. Even though you can sense how the film will end, it still leaves a lasting impact. Samuthirakani walks away with all the brownie points for his moving performance as a father who gives up on his own dreams to make sure his son stays happy. It's not something we haven't seen before but it's likeable and highly relatable".

Sudhir Srinivasan of Cinema Express gave the film 3 out of 5 stars, stating, "Don may have the exterior of a fun, college film, but its core is made of solid emotion. Though our sympathies lie with Chakravarthy, the film remembers that he's still a naïve, college student, who lacks the capacity to see the bigger picture". Manoj Kumar R of The Indian Express gave the film 3 out of 5 stars, stating, "The coming-of-age campus drama is all about the protagonist learning there are no villains in his life. There are only well-meaning people with different life experiences. The guilt trip in Don is enormous, it may even well up your eyes a few times. But, it all ends well and leaves you with a good mood and satisfaction, something that we have missed in movies for a long time".

Ranjana Krishnakumar of Film Companion, stated that "The real miracle of Don, however, is its hero, Sivakarthikeyan. He sells the hell out of the film with bucketloads of earnestness. He brings vulnerability, and therefore likeability, to a character that could easily have had shades of arrogance. He is so amused by his own antics that we don't see how silly and easy they turn out to be. He dances like an absolute charm radiating joyful energy. He makes the humour work. He performs mimicry in a delightfully natural course of the film. He acts more than his money's worth. In the hands of any other actor in Tamil cinema today, Don would have been a painfully mediocre film. In Sivakarthikeyan's hands, it's a forgivably mediocre one". Ananda Vikatan rated the film 42 out of 100. However, Ashameera Aiyappan from Firstpost gave 2.5 rating out of 5 and stated that "the performances largely bring this inherent ‘truth’ to the front. Sivakarthikeyan, Samuthirakani, and SJ Suryah give compelling performances that almost make us forgive the contrivances and exaggerations in treatment. Well, almost."

Accusations of toxic parenting 
Despite the film's commercial and critically success, it has received criticism for seemingly glorifying toxic parenting. Samuthirakani's character Ganesan was compared unfavourably to Nassar's from Em Magan (2006), and many criticised the closing text "Celebrate your parents when they are with you" due to the amount of abuse and non-affection Sivakarthikeyan's character receives from his father throughout the narrative.

Accolades

References

External links 
 

2020s coming-of-age films
2020s Tamil-language films
2022 directorial debut films
2022 films
Films about filmmaking
Films scored by Anirudh Ravichander
Films set in universities and colleges
Films shot in Agra
Films shot in Chennai
Films shot in Coimbatore
Films shot in Pollachi
Indian coming-of-age films